César Velez da Silva (born 21 July 1992), commonly known as Cesinha, is a Brazilian footballer who currently plays as a forward for Treze, on loan from Perilima.

Club career
Cesinha started his career with amateur sides in Recife, before signing with Vera Cruz in 2014. In his first season with the Vitória de Santo Antão-based club, he was their leading scorer at under-23 level. He left in 2015 to join Uniclinic, where he went by the name Cezinha.

He joined Vitória das Tabocas later the same year, but only managed 2 appearances in the second tier of the Campeonato Pernambucano, scoring once. He moved on to América Futebol Clube in Pernambuco ahead of the 2016 season, which he finished as the club's top scorer with three goals.

Later in 2016, he joined Afogados da Ingazeira, where he scored four goals in the second tier of the Campeonato Pernambucano before joining Auto Esporte, with whom he had signed a pre-contract deal.

After 2 goals in 8 games for O Clube do Povo, Cesinha joined Atlético Pernambucano ahead of the 2017 Campeonato Brasileiro Série D. He scored in his first three games, and netted two in his fourth, in a 2–2 draw with Itabaiana.

Career statistics

Club

Notes

References

External links
 Cesinha at Auto Esporte Clube
 Goal tally at the Brazilian Football Confederation

1992 births
Living people
Brazilian footballers
Association football forwards
Auto Esporte Clube players
Campeonato Brasileiro Série D players